Konstantin Kasimir Sidney Konga (born 21 May 1991 as Konstantin Kasimir Sidney Klein) is a German professional basketball player for Eisbären Bremerhaven of the German ProA. Standing at 1.87 m (6 ft 1.5 in) he plays at the point guard position.

Professional career
In May 2012, he signed with Fraport Skyliners.

On 10 August 2016, Konga signed a three-year deal with Telekom Baskets Bonn.
On 28 July 2020, Konga returned to Skyliners Frankfurt.

On July 22, 2021, he has signed with Eisbären Bremerhaven of the German ProA.

National team
In 2015, Klein was selected for the German national basketball team. He didn't make the cut for the EuroBasket 2015 selection.

References

1991 births
Living people
German men's basketball players
Medalists at the 2015 Summer Universiade
Point guards
Riesen Ludwigsburg players
Rockets (basketball club) players
Skyliners Frankfurt players
Basketball players from Berlin
Telekom Baskets Bonn players
Universiade medalists in basketball
Universiade silver medalists for Germany
21st-century German people